The Branford-Horry House is located at 59 Meeting Street, Charleston, South Carolina. It was named to the National Register of Historic Places in 1970. The house is unusual for its piazza, which extends over the public sidewalk.

The three-story house of stuccoed brick has Georgian interiors. The front piazza, built over the sidewalk, was added by Branford's grandson, Elias Horry, in about 1830.  In 1988, a speeding car crashed into the house, knocking out two of the columns and sending one into the front door of the house. The house was built after 1751, when William Branford married Elizabeth Savage, who had inherited the corner parcel from her uncle Benjamin Savage. Upon her death in 1801, the home was inherited by Ann Branford and her husband Thomas Horry.

See also
Capers-Motte House
Miles Brewton House
Robert Brewton House

References

Further reading
Robert P. Stockton, Information for Guides of Historic Charleston, South Carolina 344-45 (1985).

Houses on the National Register of Historic Places in South Carolina
Houses in Charleston, South Carolina
Georgian architecture in South Carolina
Houses completed in 1767
National Register of Historic Places in Charleston, South Carolina
1767 establishments in South Carolina